This is a list of the most viewed Disney Channel original series episodes. The most viewed Disney Channel original series episodes are tied with "Rollercoaster" by the American animated musical comedy television series Phineas and Ferb.Country Cousins by the American teen sitcom That’s So Raven During both their premieres  on July 29, 2005 and August 17, 2007 both episodes received 10.8 million viewers respectively.

All episodes in this list must have reached more than 5 million viewers in their premiere. The series Hannah Montana has with 17 episodes over 5 million viewers the most episodes on the list, following by the series Wizards of Waverly Place, Sonny with a Chance and Phil of the Future with 7 each.

List of the most viewed Disney Channel original series episodes

References

Disney Channel original programming
Disney-related lists
Disney Channel original series episodes